Lions Gate Entertainment Corporation, doing business as Lionsgate, is a Canadian-American entertainment company. It was formed by Frank Giustra on July 10, 1997, domiciled in Vancouver, British Columbia, Canada, and is currently headquartered in Santa Monica, California, United States. In addition to its flagship Lionsgate Films division, the company contains other divisions such as Lionsgate Television and Lionsgate Interactive. It owns a variety of subsidiaries such as Summit Entertainment, Debmar-Mercury, and Starz Inc.

History

Early history
Lionsgate was formed in 1997 by Frank Giustra with a $16 million investment including another $40 million from other investors which included Keyur Patel and Yorkton Securities' executives such as G. Scott Paterson. Giustra had recently retired as CEO from Yorkton, an investment bank, and Paterson was then president. Giustra then merged Lionsgate with Toronto Stock Exchange listed Beringer Gold Corp. (founded in 1986) to take the company public. Beringer's mining assets were soon sold off.

Acquisitions
Lionsgate then began a series of acquisitions to get into the film industry. The company bought a number of small production facilities and distributors, starting with Montreal-based Cinépix Film Properties (renamed as Lions Gate Films) and North Shore Studios (renamed Lions Gate Studios) in Vancouver, British Columbia. Mandalay Television was acquired by Lionsgate from Peter Guber for a 4% Lionsgate stake. In 1998, Lionsgate helped Guber form Mandalay Pictures with a 45% investment in Mandalay. Lionsgate followed that up with a June purchase of International Movie Group, Inc. (IMG), a bankrupt film distributor previously invested in by Guber and Yorktown Securities, for its film library. IMG's CEO Peter Strauss became President of Lions Gate Entertainment, Inc. (LGE), the American parent company for Lionsgate's U.S. interests. The Lions Gate Media subsidiary was also formed to produce for television.

Completing its first year of operation, Lionsgate had a revenue of $42.2 million with a loss of $397,000. The company share price dropped to a low of $1.40. This limited the corporation's ability to make acquisitions via stock swaps. Lionsgate instead made its next acquisition of Termite Art Productions, a reality-based television production company, for $2.75 million by issuing three convertible promissory notes. Giustra had the shareholders vote to move the company's public listing from the Toronto Stock Exchange to the American Stock Exchange, along with a two-for-one stock consolidation to qualify, for greater exposure that might boost share value.

In January 1999, Roman Doroniuk was named president and chief operating officers of Lionsgate, which led to the corporation's financial operations being moved in April to Doroniuk's offices in Toronto, Ontario while corporate headquarters remained in Vancouver, British Columbia. Lionsgate created US based Avalanche Films and acquired half of Sterling Home Entertainment, both in video sales. Again, Lionsgate registered losses in its second year of $9.3 million on revenues of $78.3 million with most of the losses from its stake in Mandalay Pictures. Thus in the summer, Lionsgate placed its studios up for sale with no buyers. TV operations were changed to non-network hourlong series over riskier network shows and ended its relationship with Mandalay Television. The corporation sought out more capital and cash with a filing of a preliminary prospectus for the sale of preferred stock and common stock warrants and a $13.4 million line of credit.

Lionsgate increases and new CEO
Additional acquisition funding arrived in January 2000 as a $33.1 million investment from an investor group that included Paul Allen, former Sony Pictures executive Jon Feltheimer, German broadcasting company Tele-Munchen, and SBS Broadcasting SA. This led to Feltheimer taking over as CEO from Giustra thus the passed over Doroniuk left the company. Feltheimer increased film making including several $1 million films at Avalanche. However, Federgreen still remains one of the major owners of the company and is extremely involved in the making of all their major movies. In June, Lionsgate acquired Trimark Holdings, Inc. for approximately $50 million in stock and cash including taking on $36 million in debt.

Lionsgate continued making acquisitions during the decade to boost distribution and its film library. On December 15, 2003, Lionsgate acquired Artisan Entertainment for $220 million. In 2004, Erik Nelson reacquired Termite Art and renamed it to Creative Differences.

Lionsgate partnered with Panamax Films in 2005 to make movies for the Latino market which only produced two films. On April 13, 2005, Lionsgate spun off its Canadian distribution unit into a new distribution unit called Maple Pictures under the direction of two former Lionsgate executives, Brad Pelman and Laurie May. On August 1, 2005, Lions Gate Entertainment acquired the entire library of Modern Entertainment, the U.S. film division of the Swedish television company Modern Times Group. On October 17, 2005, Lionsgate acquired UK company Redbus Film Distribution for $35 million and became Lionsgate UK on February 23, 2006.

On March 15, 2006, Lionsgate sold Lionsgate Studios to Bosa Development Corporation. On July 12, Lionsgate purchased Debmar-Mercury, an independent television distributor, which has continued operations as a Lionsgate subsidiary. The company agreed in August to lease term with New Mexico State Land Office and the city of Rio Rancho for a new 52.8 acres studio near Rio Rancho's under construction city center and arena.

On July 26, 2007, Lionsgate bought a partial stake in independent film distribution company Roadside Attractions. Lionsgate started up Lionsgate Music by June 2007. On September 10, 2007, Lionsgate bought Mandate Pictures for $56.3 million, $44.3 million in cash and $12 million in stock, and taking on $6.6 million of Mandate's debt. Mandate Chief Executive Joe Drake returned to the company as co-chief operating officer of its film unit.

By July 2008, Lionsgate has not made any progress on building its new film studio in Rio Rancho or on setting up the corporation to run the studio per its agreement with New Mexico. In November, Lionsgate Music established a joint venture with music publishing company Wind-up Records.

In January 2009, Lionsgate purchased TV Guide Network and TVGuide.com from Rovi for $255 million cash. In May 2009, Lionsgate sold a 49% stake in TV Guide Network and website to One Equity Partners under pressure from shareholder Carl Icahn.

Lionsgate cut back its slate of films per year by four in February 2009. In April, Relativity Media signed with Lionsgate for a 5 picture per year multi-year film distribution. In August, Lionsgate signed with Redbox for a five-year same day release deal worth $158 million. Lionsgate, along with MGM and Paramount Pictures/Viacom, was also a co-owner of Epix, a pay TV movie channel which debuted on October 30.

On September 13, 2010, Lionsgate and Televisa formed a joint venture, Pantelion Films, to produce for the next five years eight to 10 films a year targeted for the U.S. Latin American market.

Lionsgate sold off its Canadian distribution unit, Maple Pictures, in September 2011 to Alliance Films.

Lionsgate announced on January 13, 2012, that it had acquired Summit Entertainment, producers and distributors of the Twilight Saga films, for $412.5 million. The two companies have planned on merging since 2008. On October 6, 2012, Lions Gate Entertainment announced that Brian Goldsmith became the co-COO of the company and joining co-COO Steve Beeks. On November 18, 2012, Lionsgate announced it has passed over the $1 billion mark for the first time with the success of The Hunger Games and The Twilight Saga: Breaking Dawn – Part 2.

On December 23, 2013, Lionsgate announced they have crossed over $1 billion domestically and internationally for the second year in a row with the success of The Hunger Games: Catching Fire, Now You See Me, Instructions Not Included, and Kevin Hart: Let Me Explain.

On April 14, 2014, Comcast acquired the remaining stakes in Fearnet from LGF and Sony Pictures Entertainment. On April 21, 2014, Lionsgate announced that they will merge its movie marketing operations. A few days later, on April 30, Lionsgate announced that the studios will expand into the gaming development.

In 2015, Lionsgate took over the distribution functions for CBS Films, the film division of CBS Corporation.

On February 11, 2015, John C. Malone swapped a 4.5% stake with 14.5% of the voting power in Starz Inc. for 3.4% of Lionsgate's shares while joining the company's board of directors. Fourteen days later, Starz CEO Chris Albrecht hinted a possible merger with Lionsgate.

On April 1, 2015, according to Deadline, Lionsgate announced it has created its new label, Lionsgate Premiere. This new label will handle up to 15 releases a year, targeting young audiences at theaters and digital outlets. The new label, part of the company's diversification effort, will incorporate Lionsgate and Summit Entertainment titles (including the Step Up film series and the Red film series) and then specialize in "innovative multiplatform and other release strategies" to reach "affinity audiences with branded content and targeted marketing." Marketing and Research SVP Jean McDowell will handle marketing, with distribution to be run by Adam Sorensen, who currently manages Western Sales.

On November 10, 2015, Malone's two other companies, Liberty Global and Discovery, Inc. (now Warner Bros. Discovery), made a joint investment of $195–400 million in Lionsgate and acquired a 3.4% stake in the company. Then on June 30, 2016, Lionsgate agreed to acquire Starz Inc. for $4.4 billion in cash and stock. As of December 2016, it became the parent company of Starz Inc.

On November 12, 2015, Lionsgate created a partnership with Armenian American television producer Craig Piligian when the studio acquired more than 50% of his Pilgrim Studios company worth $200 million. Piligian retained his position as CEO of the company while Pilgrim will continue to operate independently under Piligian. The deal made Lionsgate a major unscripted player.

On July 13, 2016, Lionsgate acquired a minority stake in British unscripted television production startup company Primal Media. It was launched by Matt Steiner and Adam Wood, who originally launched Gogglebox Entertainment that was acquired by Sony Pictures Television.

AT&T also owns an approximately 2% stake in Lionsgate.

On December 15, 2017, the weekly US financial newspaper Barron's revealed that Malone was selling nearly 108,000 class B shares in Lionsgate for $3.2 million, or $29.63 each, from December 4 to 13. Malone now owns directly and indirectly 6 million nonvoting class B shares, as well as beneficially about 6 million class A shares, which carry one vote each.

Following the Weinstein effect, Lionsgate was listed as one of 22 potential buyers interested in acquiring The Weinstein Company.

In 2018, Lionsgate's newly launched digital content unit, Studio L, announced its first slate. In October 2018, Agapy Kapouranis replaced Peter Iacono as president of international television and digital distribution.

Acquisition target in 2018
In January 2018, it was reported that Lionsgate was being subject to a bidding war for a possible acquisition, with Amazon.com (which went on to announce its intent to acquire Metro-Goldwyn-Mayer on May 26, 2021), Comcast, Sony Pictures, Verizon Communications, CBS Corporation, and Viacom (with CBS and Viacom remerging into ViacomCBS in 2019) having made offers.

At the time, Lionsgate Vice Chairman Michael Burns stated in an interview with CNBC that Lionsgate was mostly interested in merging with CBS and Viacom. Viacom and Lionsgate were both interested in acquiring The Weinstein Company.

On February 27, 2018, a month after the bidding war announcement, Variety reported in a detailed article that toy manufacturing company Hasbro (which had collaborated with the company in the 2017 film My Little Pony: The Movie via its Allspark Pictures theatrical film financing unit which is in turn owned by its Allspark division) came close to also acquiring Lionsgate, but the deal fell through. Hasbro would later go on to acquire Entertainment One on December 30, 2019.

Recent history
On October 3, 2019, Malone completed the sale of his stake in the studio.

In April 2021, Lionsgate's Starz Inc. division filed an injunction in Brazil, Argentina and Mexico against The Walt Disney Company over the use of the Star+ brand in Latin America. The two companies would reach a settlement in August that same year.

In July 2021, Lionsgate purchased a 20 percent equity stake in Spyglass Media Group and acquired the catalogue of The Weinstein Company from Spyglass.

From January 2023, Lionsgate entered a movie distribution deal with Cineplex Pictures, a subsidiary of Toronto-based Cineplex Entertainment which will see the release of selected Lionsgate titles in Canada.

Distribution
The distribution of selected recent non-in-house films for pay-per-view and on-demand are under the supervision of NBCUniversal Syndication Studios under Universal Pictures (Universal formerly held home video and television rights to many of the early Lionsgate films), while all others (particularly the in-house films) are distributed for both cable and broadcast television through Lionsgate's syndicated division. Metro-Goldwyn-Mayer Studios under MGM Television are also distributed in international cable, digital and broadcast television through Lionsgate's syndicated division.

Films

Aside from home video distribution of films sub-licensed from other studios, Lionsgate's library consists of its own in-house productions, as well as films from Summit Entertainment and several defunct studios, including Trimark Pictures (acquired in 2000), Artisan Entertainment (acquired in 2003), Overture Films (Starz's former feature film division whose library Lionsgate acquired after the 2016 Starz merger), Hearst Entertainment, Tribune Entertainment, Zoetrope Corporation (with certain exceptions), Vestron Pictures (acquired by Artisan in 1991), The Weinstein Company and Dimension Films (through its 20% stake in Spyglass Media Group). Their complete ownership depends on the worldwide regions of license.

Divisions

Home entertainment

Before Lions Gate Films Home Entertainment was formed, Lions Gate's video releases were distributed by Universal Pictures Home Entertainment and Columbia TriStar Home Entertainment. Lionsgate Films decided to create two home video labels: Avalanche Home Entertainment, which released smaller Canadian B-movies on video and DVD; and Sterling Home Entertainment (a joint venture with Scanbox International, a Danish film company), which released American low-budget movies on video and DVD in the late 1990s.

In June 2000, Lionsgate purchased Trimark Pictures and its in-house home video unit. These three companies: Avalanche, Sterling, and Trimark Home Video were merged into Lions Gate Home Entertainment in 2001. After the acquisition, Sterling Home Entertainment was then renamed to Studio Home Entertainment, which later on folded itself into Lionsgate. In 2003, Lionsgate acquired Artisan Entertainment, thus expanding Lionsgate's home video library.

Its library of more than 8,000 films owes some of its size to output deals with other studios. Mainly concerned with the distribution of the Lions Gate film library, it also distributed Mattel's Barbie-branded videos, as well as Clifford the Big Red Dog videos from Scholastic, Stickin' Around videos from Nelvana, and MGA Entertainment,. Lionsgate Home Entertainment also previously distributed videos from HIT Entertainment and Jim Henson Home Entertainment until 2012 and 2014 respectively when the studios made new deals with Universal Pictures Home Entertainment and Gaiam Vivendi Entertainment. Through Artisan, the company also released the back catalog of ITC Entertainment until 2013, when ITC's successor-in-interest ITV Studios Global Entertainment signed a deal with Shout! Factory.

In 2001, in Quebec it was renamed Crystal Films, and in Ontario and other provinces, Maple Pictures.

In August 2001, Lions Gate Home Entertainment signed a deal with DIC Entertainment to distribute their back catalogue of animated titles on video and DVD in the United States, replacing DIC's long time partner Buena Vista Home Entertainment. The partnership only lasted a year, as in 2003 DIC started to distribute their shows through the Sterling Entertainment Group (no connection to the ex-Lionsgate subsidiary Sterling Home Entertainment) and later other distribution companies like Shout! Factory, 20th Century Fox Home Entertainment and NCircle Entertainment.

Lionsgate's movies are released on DVD and Blu-ray as well as on the PSP through Universal Media Disc.

Since 2012, LGHE started distributing Summit Entertainment releases as a result of Lionsgate acquiring that company.

On August 4, 2008, Lionsgate announced that it had completed a deal with Walt Disney Studios Home Entertainment to acquire the distribution rights to several ABC Studios/Touchstone Television shows including According to Jim, Reaper, Hope & Faith, 8 Simple Rules and Boy Meets World.

Until 2012, Lionsgate also distributed most of the theatrical properties held by Republic Pictures on DVD under license from Paramount Pictures. The deal also expanded to include some non-marquee films originally released by Paramount themselves. Recently, with the folding of Republic, Lionsgate's function was transferred to Olive Films (and later Kino Lorber).

In February 2011, Lionsgate and StudioCanal made an agreement to release 550 titles from the Miramax film library worldwide. Following ViacomCBS' acquisition of a 49% stake in Miramax, Paramount Home Entertainment took over the home media rights to the Miramax catalog.

On December 8, 2016, Lionsgate acquired Starz Inc. making Lionsgate the parent company of the North American branches of Anchor Bay Entertainment and Manga Entertainment. The former was folded into Lionsgate Home Entertainment shortly after the buyout and the latter is planned to be relaunched in the near future.

On June 30, 2021, Lionsgate's distribution deal with 20th Century Studios Home Entertainment expired, and Sony Pictures Home Entertainment began distributing Lionsgate's releases in North America as of July 1, 2021.

Lionsgate Interactive Ventures and Games
Lionsgate Interactive Ventures and Games is the video game development division of Lionsgate. It was created in April 2014 and is headed by Nerdist Industries co-founder Peter Levin. This division is dedicated to producing and distributing multiplatform games based on Lionsgate franchises, and investing in digital businesses. One of these franchises was Blair Witch, with Lionsgate Games publishing a Blair Witch game in 2019.

Lionsgate Entertainment World
Lionsgate Entertainment World is an indoor interactive experience centre based on Lionsgate's blockbuster films, such as The Hunger Games, The Divergent Series and Now You See Me, is set to open on Hengqin, Zhuhai, China in the first half of 2019. The Lionsgate project is an investment by Hong Kong conglomerate Lai Sun Group and designed and produced by Thinkwell Group.

Studio complexes

Lionsgate Studios Yonkers
On September 5, 2019, Great Point Capital Management signed a deal with Lionsgate to build a new production facility in Yonkers, New York, with Lionsgate becoming a long-term anchor tenant and investor. As the anchor tenant, Lionsgate will have naming rights to the studio. Construction on the site will start in November, and the facility will be running in late autumn 2020. The $100 million complex will include three 20,000-square-feet and two 10,000-square-feet stages, a fully operational back lot and the opportunity to create a location-based entertainment property.  The studio, will be built next to the former Otis Elevator Company building in Getty Square and is expected to provide 420 new jobs in Yonkers, the developers said. They received numerous tax breaks and exemptions to build the project.
National Resources will be an investment partner and project developer, responsible for all phases of design and construction of the studio complex.
 On April 8, 2020, it was announced that the developers locked down $60 million in financing while the rest of the $40 million in the second phase of the project will be anchored by entertainment firm Lionsgate.

Lionsgate Newark studio
In 2022, the city of Newark, New Jersey announced that a major new film and television production studio overlooking Weequahic Park and Weequahic Golf Course, "Lionsgate Newark," would open in 2024 on the 15-acre former Seth Boyden housing projects site at 101 Center Terrace in the Dayton section of the city near Evergreen Cemetery. Lionsgate Newark will partner on public relations and community affairs with the New Jersey Performing Arts Center.

Television

Lionsgate Television produced such series as Nashville, Anger Management, The Dead Zone, 5ive Days to Midnight, Weeds, Nurse Jackie, Boss, Tyler Perry's House of Payne and the Emmy Award-winning Mad Men. Lionsgate also acquired TV syndication firm Debmar-Mercury in 2006 with CBS Television Distribution handling ad-sales with the exception for Meet the Browns, as the ad-sales are handled by Disney–ABC Domestic Television and Turner Television / Warner Bros. Domestic Television Distribution co-distributing the series. In March 2013, Lionsgate signed with Mars One (a Dutch nonprofit with space agency and aerospace backers intent on colonizing Mars) to produce a reality TV show. In August 2018, Lionsgate signed a first-look television development agreement with Universal Music Group.

Media networks
The company owns Starz, a premium-tier cable network, and related channels including Starz Encore, and MoviePlex. In addition, Lionsgate also co-owns Celestial Tiger Entertainment with Saban Capital Group and Celestial Pictures.

Assets

Motion pictures
 Lionsgate Films (Lionsgate Motion Picture Group)
 Lionsgate Premiere
 Summit Entertainment
 Summit Premiere
 Summit Entertainment Records
 International Distribution Company, LLC (joint venture with Pedro Rodriguez)
 Spyglass Media Group (20%)
 Pantelion Films (50% with TelevisaUnivision)
 Roadside Attractions (45%)
 Grindstone Entertainment Group
 Studio L
 Globalgate Entertainment (joint venture with Televisa Cine (Mexico), Tobis Film (Germany), Nordisk Film (Denmark), TME Films (Turkey), TF1 Studio (France), Lotte Entertainment (South Korea), Belga Films (Belgium), PKDN Films (Japan), Paris Filmes (Brazil), Viva Films (Philippines), Falcon Pictures (Indonesia), Cine Colombia (Colombia) and Rai Cinema (Italy))
 Good Universe
 Bad Hombre
 Lionsgate Home Entertainment
 Lionsgate Family Entertainment
 Lionsgate UK
 Elevation Sales (joint venture with StudioCanal UK)
 Primal Media
 Potboiler Television (joint venture with Potboiler Productions)
 Lionsgate India
 Lionsgate Interactive Ventures and Games
 Lionsgate Global Franchise Management
 Lionsgate Music

Television production and distribution
 Lionsgate Television
 Debmar-Mercury
 Sea to Sky Entertainment (joint venture with Thunderbird Entertainment)
 Pilgrim Studios
 1620 Media
 3 Arts Entertainment (majority stake)

Media networks
 Starz Networks
 Starz and 5 sister channels
 Starz Encore and 7 sister channels
 MoviePlex
 IndiePlex
 RetroPlex
 Laugh Out Loud (joint venture with HartBeat Digital)
 Tribeca Shortlist (joint venture with Tribeca Enterprises)
 Celestial Tiger Entertainment (joint venture with Celestial Pictures and Saban Capital Group)
 Celestial Movies
 Celestial Movies HD
 Celestial Classic Movies
 Celestial Movies Pinoy
 cHK
 KIX
 Thrill
 Miao Mi

Former
 Anchor Bay Entertainment
 Anchor Bay Films
 Video Treasures
 HGV Video Productions
 Starmaker Entertainment
 Media Home Entertainment
 Fox Hills Video
 The Nostalgia Merchant
 Hi-Tops Video
 Burbank Video
 Prism Entertainment/Prism Pictures
 Wizard Video
 MNTEX Entertainment
 Regal Video
 Strand Home Video
 Artisan Entertainment
 LIVE Entertainment/International Video Entertainment
 U.S.A. Home Video
 Family Home Entertainment - Renamed Lionsgate Family Entertainment
 The Video Late Show
 Magnum Entertainment
 Vestron Video
 Vestron Pictures
 Lightning Video
 Lightning Pictures
 Children's Video Library
 Carolco Home Video
 Avid Home Entertainment
 VCL (Germany)
 Thiller Video
 King Bee Video
 Avalanche Home Entertainment 
 Codeblack Films
 Comic-Con HQ
 Defy Media (19%)
 Epix - Metro-Goldwyn-Mayer acquired Lionsgate's stake in the network in 2017
 Epix2
 Epix Drive-In
 Epix Hits
 Fearnet - NBCUniversal acquired Lionsgate's stake in the network in 2013
 Film Roman - acquired by Waterman Entertainment in 2015; pre-2015 library retained by Starz
 Mandalay Pictures (1997–2002)
 Mandate Pictures
 Manga Entertainment (US branch)
 Maple Pictures
 Miramax - Paramount Home Entertainment acquired distribution rights to the entire Miramax library on September 22, 2020
 Modern Entertainment-acquired from Modern Times Group in 2005.
 Crown International Pictures library
 New Visions Pictures library
 New Century Entertainment library
 Continental Film Group library
 Overture Films
 Pacific International Enterprises
 Pantaya (stake sold in 2021)
 Pop - 50% stake; sold to co-owner CBS Corporation in March 2019, and part of Paramount Global since Dec 4, 2019
 Redbus Film Distribution
 Redbus Home Entertainment
 Starz Distribution
 Studio Home Entertainment
 Sterling Home Entertainment
 Termite Art Productions
 Trimark Pictures
 Vidmark Entertainment

Libraries

Current
 Lionsgate Films
 Summit Entertainment
 Lionsgate Television
 Debmar-Mercury
 Roadside Attractions
 Codeblack Films
 The Weinstein Company/Lantern Entertainment
 Dimension Films (post-2005)
 Radius-TWC/Radius
 New World Pictures (through Lakeshore Entertainment; 1984–1989)
 Anchor Bay Entertainment
 Artisan Entertainment
 Manga Entertainment (US only)
 Overture Films
 Pacific International Enterprises
 Crown International Pictures
 Producers Sales Organization/Vestron Pictures
 De Laurentiis Entertainment Group
 Avco Embassy Pictures/Embassy Pictures
 C2 Pictures
 The Halcyon Company
 Trimark Pictures
 Third-party distributors:
 Entertainment Studios
 Freestyle Releasing
 A24
 Saban Films
 Carolco Pictures

Former
 ITC Entertainment
 Miramax
 Dimension Films (pre-2005)
 Mandalay Pictures

Corporate governance
Board of Directors as of July 2021:

Chairman of the Board of Directors
 Mark Rachesky, M.D., founder and president of MHR Fund Management
Directors
 Michael Burns, vice-chairman of Lionsgate
 Mignon Clyburn, president of MLC Strategies
 Gordon Crawford, former Capital Research executive
 Jon Feltheimer, CEO of Lionsgate
 Emily Fine, executive at MHR Fund Management
 Michael Fries, CEO and vice-chairman of Liberty Global
 Susan McCaw, president of SRM Capital
 Yvette Ostolaza, partner at Sidley Austin
 Daryl Simm, chairman and CEO of Omnicom Media
 Hardwick Simmons, former chairman and CEO of NASDAQ

See also
 Lists of Lionsgate films

References

External links

 
 Official UK website
 Lionsgate Entertainment archives at the University of Toronto Media Commons
 

 
1997 establishments in British Columbia
Companies based in Santa Monica, California
Companies listed on the New York Stock Exchange
Entertainment companies established in 1997
Entertainment companies based in California
Film distributors of the United States
Film production companies of the United States
Mass media companies established in 1997
Television production companies of the United States
Home video companies of the United States
International sales agents